The 2019 mayoral election in Charlotte, North Carolina, was held on Tuesday, November 5, 2019. A primary was held on September 10, 2019. A primary runoff, if needed, would have been October 8, 2019, but one was not needed because incumbent Mayor Vi Lyles handily won the Democratic primary. The filing deadline for this election was July 19, 2019.
the Mayor Lyles, first elected for a two-year term in 2017, was eligible to seek re-election. She was re-elected in a landslide over Republican David Rice.

Democratic primary

Candidates

Declared
Roderick Davis
Vi Lyles, incumbent Mayor
Tigress Sydney Acute McDaniel
Joel Odom
Lucille Puckett

Primary results

Republican primary

Candidates

Declared
David Michael Rice

General election

Results

References

2019
Charlotte
Charlotte